Z.P.G. (short for "Zero Population Growth") is a 1972 Danish-American dystopian science fiction film directed by Michael Campus and starring Oliver Reed and Geraldine Chaplin. It was inspired by the best-selling 1968 non-fiction book The Population Bomb, by Paul R. Ehrlich. The film concerns an overpopulated future Earth whose world government executes those who violate a 30-year ban on having children. Filmed in Denmark, the film is almost entirely set-bound featuring art direction designed to reflect a bleak, oppressive future.

Plot
Set in the future, the Earth has become severely polluted (people need to wear breathing masks when outside) with severe overpopulation affecting available resources. Because of the permanent thick smog that has settled over the dismal cities that now cover the Earth's entire surface, all animals – even common household pets - are extinct. People eat tasteless bright-colored paste out of plastic containers. To reduce the world's population, the world's government decrees that no children may be born for the next 30 years. Breaking this law will result in a death penalty for the parents as well as the newborn. Brainwashing and robot substitutes are used to end the yearning for children, with the death penalty as the ultimate deterrent. Violators are executed by suffocation under a plastic dome. Couples of fertile age visit "Babyland" and are given life-size animatronic children instead.

Russ (Oliver Reed) and Carol McNeil (Geraldine Chaplin) work in a museum recreating life in the 20th century. Carol is desperate for a child, so when she conceives she avoids the abortion machine installed in their bathroom to remain pregnant. After the child's birth, the couple must shield the baby from being discovered. Once Carol decides to break the law and have a baby, they must not only avoid the prying eyes of the Big Brother-like government, but also the growing jealousy of their own friends. Neighbors finding a couple with a real child will go into the streets screaming "baby, baby," until authorities show up.

When neighbours George (Don Gordon) and Edna Borden (Diane Cilento) find out about the baby, their initial offer to help conceal the baby leads quickly to trouble. Jealousy and envy arises as the Bordens want to share the baby as if it is a new car. The McNeils and the Bordens begin to fight over the baby and the Bordens then seek to keep the child for themselves. Finally, the McNeils are captured and placed under one of the state's execution domes, but the couple, along with the baby, manage to escape by digging underground, making their way through darkened tunnels in a raft to a remote island where there is no visible pollution. However, the whole island may still be in a radioactive state, as it was used to bury old nuclear missiles in 1978.

Cast
Oliver Reed as Russ McNeil
Geraldine Chaplin as Carol McNeil
Don Gordon as George Borden
Diane Cilento as Edna Borden
 David Markham as Doctor Herrick 
 Bill Nagy as The President 
 Sheila Reid as Mary Herrick 
 Aubrey Woods as Doctor Mallory 
 Wayne Rodda as Metromart Salesman 
 Ditte Maria Wiberg  as Telescreen Operator 
 Birgitte Federspiel as Psychiatrist

Novelization
The film was made from an original screenplay by Frank De Felitta and Max Ehrlich, inspired by Paul Ehrlich's The Population Bomb. A year prior to the film's release, Max Ehrlich published the science fiction novel, The Edict, based on the screenplay.

In the novel, the earth's resources have been strained to the limit, and in many parts of the world cannibalism and food riots are commonplace. Seeking a solution to this crisis, the leaders of WorldGov meet in emergency session. Their computers spin through billions of facts, and the reports are more than disquieting - they are chilling. Further growth of the population is unthinkable, and the leaders finally settle on the only possible solution, which is soon announced by the World Gov satellite:

To give the world some semblance of normality, realistic mechanical babies are devised to pacify the maternal instincts of 10 billion women. But to Carol, the very idea of accepting one of the robot infants is abhorrent. She wants and needs a real child, and this slowly becomes an obsession.

Special effects
Derek Meddings created the life-size realistic animatronic children for the film.

Awards
Geraldine Chaplin won Best Actress at the 1972 Sitges Film Festival for her performance.

See also
 Survival film, about the film genre, with a list of related films

References

External links
 
 A review at the New York Times
 A screening at the San Francisco Festival of Fantastic Film, with pictures

1972 films
1970s science fiction films
1970s dystopian films
American dystopian films
Danish science fiction films
Films set in the future
Overpopulation fiction
Films directed by Michael Campus
Paramount Pictures films
1972 directorial debut films
1970s English-language films
1970s American films